Three Days Grace are a Canadian rock band consisting of members Barry Stock, Neil Sanderson, Brad Walst and Matt Walst. They have been nominated for numerous awards including the Billboard Music Awards, the Juno Awards and the MuchMusic Video Awards.

BDS Spin Award
The Broadcast Data Systems, better known as BDS, is a service that tracks monitored radio, television and internet airplay of songs based on the number of spins and detections. Three Days Grace received seven BDS Spin awards.

Billboard Music Awards
The Billboard Music Awards are honours given out annually by Billboard, a publication covering the music business and a music popularity chart. Three Days Grace received one Billboard Music award out of the three nominations.

BMI Awards
The BMI Film & TV Awards are accolades presented annually by Broadcast Music, Inc., honouring songwriters, composers, and music publishers in various genres. Three Days Grace received 2 BMI awards. 

Casby Awards
The CASBY Awards were a Canadian awards ceremony for independent and alternative music, presented annually by Toronto, Ontario radio station CFNY, currently branded as 102.1 The Edge. Three Days Grace received two Casby awards out of the three nominations. 

FMQB AwardsFriday Morning Quarterback (better known as FMQB) was a trade magazine which covered the radio and music industries in the United States. Its coverage included programming, management, promotion, marketing, and airplay for music formatted radio. Three Days Grace earned one FMQB Award.

MuchMusic Video Awards
The iHeartRadio MMVAs were an annual awards show broadcast on Much to honour the year's best music videos that was last held in 2018. Three Days Grace have received eight MuchMusic Video Award nominations.

iHeartRadio Music Awards
The iHeartRadio Music Awards is a music awards show that celebrates music heard throughout the year across iHeartMedia radio stations nationwide and on iHeartRadio, iHeartMedia's digital music platform. Three Days Grace won one iHeartRadio Music award out of the five nominations.

Juno Awards
The Juno Awards, more popularly known as the JUNOS, are awards presented annually to Canadian musical artists and bands to acknowledge their artistic and technical achievements in all aspects of music. Three Days Grace received one Juno award out of the twelve nominations.

Loudwire Music Awards
Loudwire is an American online media magazine that covers news of hard rock and heavy metal artists. It is owned by media and entertainment business Townsquare Media. Three Days Grace received three Loudwire Music awards out of the five nominations.

Mediabase Awards
Mediabase is a music industry service that monitors radio station airplay in 180 US and Canadian markets. Mediabase publishes music charts and data based on the most played songs on terrestrial and satellite radio, and provides in-depth analytical tools for radio and record industry professionals. Three Days Grace received two awards out of two nominations.

MTV Video Music Awards

Pollstar Awards
Pollstar is a trade publication for the concert and live music industry. Three Days Grace received one nomination.

Radio Music Awards
The Radio Music Awards was an annual U.S. award show that honoured the year's most successful songs on mainstream radio. Nominations were based on the amount of airplay recording artists receive on radio stations in various formats using chart information compiled by Mediabase. Three Days Grace received two nominations.

Socan Awards
The Society of Composers, Authors and Music Publishers of Canada (SOCAN) is a Canadian performance rights organization that represents the performing rights of more than 135,000 songwriters, composers and music publishers. Three Days Grace have received two awards out of the two nominations.

References

Lists of awards received by Canadian musician
Lists of awards received by musical group